Prior to the draft, they were allowed to carry over three players from their PBL team: Jay-R Reyes, Junjun Cabatu and Jay Sagad. Furthermore, they also took part in an expansion draft in which they were able to select three players from the other PBA teams who were not protected by their clubs, acquiring Rob Wainwright, Gilbert Lao and Denver Lopez in the process. Starting at the 2005 draft, the league has limited the draft to two rounds; all undrafted players will become free agents.

Abby Santos from the University of the Philippines, Diliman became the team's first draft choice, the 10th pick in the 2006 PBA Draft, although he was not signed by the team. The immediate next pick, his schoolmate Jireh Ibañes, was the first draftee to play for the team.

Just as with other expansion teams, Welcoat had a difficult first couple of seasons, allowing them to participate in the draft lottery. Like in the National Basketball Association (NBA) Draft, a draft lottery determines which team gets the first overall draft pick, but on a much smaller scale; only the two worst-performing teams in the preceding season participate. The team with the worst record has a 67% chance of clinching the #1 seed while the second-worst only gets a 33% chance.

In Rain or Shine's eight seasons in the league, they were able to select two number one overall draft picks: Joe Devance from the University of Texas, El Paso and Gabe Norwood from George Mason University. Devance was awarded as a member of the league's all-rookie team in 2008, while Norwood was adjudged unanimously as the Rookie of the Year.

Selections

Notes 
1.All players entering the draft are Filipinos until proven otherwise.

References

Philippine Basketball Association draft